Dakhla may refer to:
Dakhla Oasis, Egypt
Dakhla, Western Sahara

See also
 Dakhla-Oued Ed-Dahab, a region of Morocco
 Dakahla, Egypt